In graph theory, the cutwidth of an undirected graph  is the smallest integer  with the following property: there is an ordering  of the vertices of , such that for every , there are at most  edges with one endpoint in  and the other endpoint in .

See also 

 Pathwidth
 Treewidth

References 

Integers
Graph invariants